The flag and emblem of Perak are state symbols of Perak, Malaysia. These two symbols are distinct from each other in style. Similar to other states of Malaysia with Malay royalties, both the flag and arms of Perak are influenced by royalties, Islam, and political symbols of the state.

Flag

The flag of the state of Perak, in Malaysia, is a tricolour, made of three equal horizontal bands coloured white (top), yellow, and black (bottom). Adopted on 31 January 1879, it has a ratio of 1:2.

The stripes on the flag symbolise the three branches of the Perak royal family: white represents the reigning Sultan of Perak, yellow represents the Raja Muda (the crown prince), and black represents the Raja Di Hilir (the next in succession, after the crown prince). Coincidentally, the flag resembles an inverted version of the Russian imperial colours that were in official use from 1858 to 1917.

The three colours of the flag, plus red, formed the basis of the colours that were used in the flag of the British Federated Malay States.

Emblem

The coat of arms of Perak consists of the symbol of the Sultan of Perak circled with a crescent that contains flowers of rice. The symbol of the Sultan of Perak symbolises the highness of the Sultan. The crescent denotes Islam as the state official religion, while the flowers of rice reflects the source of money for the people of Perak.

City, district and municipal coat of arms and flags

Coat of arms

Ipoh
Shield: Argent, charged with a wavy bar Azure. The base tierced per pale, Argent, Or and Sable and in chief a crescent and fourteen-pointed star Orange

Crest: A four-tower mural crown

Supporters: On a grassy compartment Two tigers rampant both grasping an Antiaris (Ipoh) tree proper

Motto: "Berkhidmat Dan Maju" (Malay: "Service and Progress")

Taiping
Shield: Sable, in base a tin ingot and a wreath of two rice stalks Or and in chief A crescent Or and fourteen-pointed star Argent

Crest: A five-tower mural crown, inscribed with the word "Aman Selama-lamanya" (Everlasting Peace in Malay)

Supporters: On a grassy compartment Two tigers rampant both grasping a rubber tree (Hevea brasiliensis) proper

Motto: "Taiping"

City flags
Perak currently does not adopt flags for its districts and municipal areas, save for Ipoh, the state capital, of whose flag is displayed below.

References

External links
 Flags of the World: Perak
 Perak State Government's Official Website
 Flagspot.net: About Perak

Perak
Perak
1879 establishments in Asia
Perak
Perak
Perak
Perak